William I of Isenburg-Braunsberg (German: Wilhelm I. von Isenburg-Braunsberg) was the Count of Isenburg-Braunsberg from 1327 until 1383. In 1338 William was raised to an Imperial Count.

1383 deaths
House of Isenburg
Year of birth unknown